The women's pole vault event at the 2000 Asian Athletics Championships was held in Jakarta, Indonesia on 29 August.

Results

References

2000 Asian Athletics Championships
Pole vault at the Asian Athletics Championships
2000 in women's athletics